Stefano Giuliani (born 2 January 1958) was a former Italian professional cyclist. He is most known for winning two stages in the Giro d'Italia.

References

Italian male cyclists
Living people
1958 births
Sportspeople from the Province of Teramo
Cyclists from Abruzzo